Reimschisel's emo skink (Emoia reimschisseli) is a species of lizard in the family Scincidae. It is found in the Moluccas.

References

Emoia
Reptiles described in 1950
Reptiles of Indonesia
Endemic fauna of Indonesia
Taxa named by Vasco M. Tanner